HMS Verulam was a V-class destroyer of the British Royal Navy that saw service during the Second World War.

Design and construction
Verulam was one of eight V-class destroyers ordered under the 1941 War Construction Programme as the 8th Emergency Flotilla on 1 September 1941. The V-class were War Emergency Programme destroyers, intended for general duties, including use as anti-submarine escort, and were to be suitable for mass-production. They were based on the hull and machinery of the pre-war J-class destroyers, but with a lighter armament (effectively whatever armament was available) in order to speed production. The V-class were repeats of the previous V-class, which in turn were almost identical to the S and T-class ordered earlier in the year. Unlike the U-class, the V-class were fitted for operations in Arctic waters.

Displacement was  standard and  full load. The ship had a crew of 179 officers and other ranks.

The ship had a main gun armament of four 4.7 inch (120 mm) QF Mk. IX guns, capable of elevating to an angle of 55 degrees, giving a degree of anti-aircraft capability. The designed close-in anti-aircraft armament for the class, as fitted to Verulam on completion, was one Hazemayer stabilised twin mount for the Bofors 40 mm gun and four twin Oerlikon 20 mm cannons, In 1945, Verulam had two twin Oerlikon mounts abreast the ship's funnel replaced by single 40 mm Bofors mounts, with two more Bofors guns fitted abreast the main mast. Two quadruple mounts for 21 inch (533 mm) torpedoes were fitted, while the ship had an depth charge outfit of four depth charge mortars and two racks, with a total of 70 charges carried. Verulam was fitted with a Type 276 surface warning radar and a high-frequency direction finding (HF/DF) aerial on the ship's lattice foremast, together with Type 291 air warning radar on a short pole mast aft. A Type 285 fire control radar was integrated with the ship's high-angle gun director, while the Hazemayer mount had an integrated Type 282 radar.

Verulam was laid down at Fairfield's Govan, Glasgow shipyard on 26 January 1942 and was launched on 22 April 1943. She was commissioned on 26 November 1943, and assigned the Pennant number R28. Verulam was completed on 10 December 1943. She was the second ship of that name, based on the Roman name for St Albans (Verulamium).

Service history

Second World War service

HMS Verulam began her service in January 1944 by joining the 26th Destroyer Flotilla, part of the Home Fleet. The same month HMS Verulam was part of the escort group attached to convoy JW 57 along with the light cruiser  and the escort carrier, . On 28 February the convoy reached the Kola Inlet with the loss of one destroyer, with the destruction of two U-boats claimed ( and ). Verulam formed part of the return convoy RA 57, with one merchant ship being sunk with the escort accounting for three U-boats. Verulam left the convoy on 7 March 1944, with the convoy reaching Loch Ewe on 10 March.

In April 1944, Verulam formed part of the Home Fleet cover force for JW 58 and Operation Tungsten. There were a large number of Allied merchant ships in Russian arctic harbour waiting to return to Britain, so Verulam was part of a strong force of warships that arrived at the Kola Inlet on 23 April, with orders to escort the merchant ships back to Britain and carry a large number of personnel, (including the US Navy crew of the cruiser , which had been loaned to the Soviet Navy, and Soviet crews for ships waiting in British harbours) with them. On 28 April, Verulam embarked seventeen US navy personnel, and joined convoy RA 59. The convoy came under attack by German submarines, with one merchant ship sunk while three U-boats were sunk by aircraft operating from the carrier . Verulam left the convoy on 3 May.

During May 1944, Verulam was detached from the Home Fleet to participate in preparations for Operation Neptune. Verulam was assigned to Force 'S' of the Eastern Task Force, for the landings at Sword Beach. On 5–6 June, Verulam, together with the destroyers ,  and  escorted Convoy S7, consisting of the headquarters ship , five Landing ship, infantry and one Landing Craft Infantry from Spithead to the disembarkation point. She continued to carry out shore bombardments and patrols to prevent German interference with the invasion until released on 27 June.

In September 1944, Verulam formed part of the covering force for the Russia bound Arctic Convoy JW 60 and the return convoy RA 60. From August 1944, the Royal Navy began an offensive against German shipping passing through Norwegian coastal waters. On 21 October, as part of this offensive, Verulam was part of the escort for the carrier  and the cruiser  as Implacables aircraft attacked Bardufoss airfield and shipping. From 26 to 28 October, Verulam again escorted Implacable as the carrier's aircraft attacked shipping off Bodø, Rørvik, Lødingen and Kristiansund. Verulam was hit 22 times by German 37mm and 20mm shells, killing two and wounding five of her crew, although the ship's fighting efficiency was unaffected.
 
Verulam was then repaired and refitted at the Port of Immingham, this refit continuing until 7 February 1945. After a work-up period at Scapa Flow, Verulam was sent to join the East Indies Fleet, arriving at Trincomalee and rejoining the rest of the 26th Flotilla on 4 April 1945.

Postwar service
In 1946 Verulam was part of the Londonderry Flotilla. Between February 1947 and March 1949 she was part of the 3rd Destroyer Flotilla, based in the Mediterranean. During that time she saw service, along with other Royal Navy ships in preventing illegal immigration into Palestine in 1947.

Between 1951 and 1952 she was converted into a Type 15 fast anti-submarine frigate at Portsmouth Dockyard, and was allocated the new pennant number F29. In 1953 she took part in the Fleet Review to celebrate the Coronation of Queen Elizabeth II. In 1954 Verulam was placed in the Portsmouth Reserve.

Between 1958 and 1961 Verulam was the Admiralty Surface Weapons Establishment (ASWE) trials ship, being used for development of the Type 2001 sonar used by the Royal Navy's early nuclear submarines. In 1961 she was transferred to the 2nd Frigate Squadron based at Portland, operating as trials ship for the Underwater Weapons Development establishment (AUWE).

Decommissioning and disposal
Verulam was paid off on 21 December 1970 and sold for scrap to John Cashmore Ltd and arrived at their yard at Newport, Wales for breaking on 23 October 1972.

References

Publications

External links
 Naval-History.net HMS Verulam

 

U and V-class destroyers of the Royal Navy
Ships built on the River Tyne
1942 ships
World War II destroyers of the United Kingdom
Cold War destroyers of the United Kingdom
Type 15 frigates
Cold War frigates of the United Kingdom
Ships built by Swan Hunter